Andrea Tafi (born 7 May 1966, in Fucecchio) is an Italian former road bicycle racer who retired from his professional career in 2005. Tafi's propensity to perform best in the harder races earned him the nickname "Il Gladiatore" (English: "The Gladiator").

Tafi specialized in the cobbled Spring Classics such as Paris–Roubaix which he won in 1999, and Tour of Flanders which he won in 2002.  He won the Giro di Lombardia in 1996 and the Italian National Championship in 1998.

Career
The most successful part of Tafi's career was spent with the Italian super-squad .  In the 1996 edition of Paris–Roubaix the team  put four of their riders in a breakaway at the front of the race:  Johan Museeuw, Gianluca Bortolami, previous year's winner Franco Ballerini, and Tafi.  Ballerini had a flat and was out of the lead group, but the other three powered their way to the finish.

In 1996 Tafi won the "race of the falling leaves" Giro di Lombardia, using his strength to overcome the climbs of the race. He said that his dream was to emulate his cycling hero fellow Italian Francesco Moser, which is to win Paris–Roubaix wearing the Tricolore jersey as the Italian National Champion.  He accomplished this in his win in 1999. He won Paris–Tours in a long breakaway effort in 2000, foiling the sprinters' teams.  After a few lacklustre years, he again shone in the 2002 edition of the hilly, cobbled classic Tour of Flanders.  Having established himself in a front breakaway with the likes of Johan Museeuw, Peter van Petegem and teammate Daniele Nardello, he made attacks after attacks, finally taking advantage of a moment's hesitation between the two home favorites Museeuw and van Petegem to solo to the finish for the win.

After the demise of the Mapei super-team, Tafi moved to the reformed  under Bjarne Riis for the 2003 season. His time with team  in 2004 also didn't re-ignite his performance.  He finally moved to the new  team for his last season in 2005. Tafi ended his career at the 2005 Paris–Roubaix, before retiring from the sport.

Comeback attempt
Having competed in amateur Masters races for several years, Tafi announced in October 2018 that he would seek a comeback in 2019 to race Paris–Roubaix on the twentieth anniversary of his victory. On 8 November 2018, it was reported that he had found a team to ride with and that would attempt to receive a wildcard invitation for the event. Would his comeback have been successful, he would have been 52 years old when riding the race. A collarbone fracture eventually put an end to Tafi's comeback plans.

Doping
Tafi's name was on the list of doping tests published by the French Senate on 24 July 2013 that were collected during the 1998 Tour de France and found positive for EPO when retested in 2004.

Major results

1989
 1st Stage 4 Vuelta a Murcia
 8th Firenze–Pistoia
 10th Overall Tour de Luxembourg
1st Stage 5
1990
 1st Stage 2 Kellogg's Tour
 3rd Overall Ruota d'Oro
 6th Firenze–Pistoia
1991
 1st Giro del Lazio
 7th Firenze–Pistoia
1992
 1st Overall Cronostaffetta
1993
 9th Firenze–Pistoia
1994
 1st Grand Prix de Fourmies
 1st GP Citta di Rio Saliceto e Correggio
 3rd Coppa Bernocchi
 4th Milano–Vignola
 5th Coppa Placci
1995
 3rd Road race, National Road Championships
 3rd GP Industria & Commercio di Prato
 4th Rund um den Henninger Turm
 5th Giro di Toscana
 6th Giro del Lazio
 9th Giro dell'Emilia
1996
 1st Giro di Lombardia
 1st Paris–Brussels
 1st Giro del Lazio
 1st Trofeo Melinda
 1st Coppa Placci
 2nd Tre Valli Varesine
 2nd Giro del Piemonte
 2nd Giro del Veneto
 3rd Paris–Roubaix
 4th Overall UCI Road World Cup
 4th Coppa Sabatini
 4th Japan Cup
 5th Gran Premio Città di Camaiore
 6th Road race, UCI Road World Championships
 8th Leeds International Classic
1997
 1st Rochester International Classic
 1st Grand Prix de Fourmies
 1st Coppa Sabatini
 Tour de Langkawi
1st Stages 3 & 9
 2nd Amstel Gold Race
 2nd Japan Cup
 3rd Overall UCI Road World Cup
 3rd Paris–Brussels
 5th Giro del Lazio
 6th Overall Tour of Galicia
 7th Giro di Lombardia
 7th Gran Premio Città di Camaiore
 8th Trofeo Matteotti
1998
 1st  Road race, National Road Championships
 1st Giro del Lazio
 1st Coppa Agostoni
 1st Gran Premio Città di Camaiore
 2nd Paris–Roubaix
 3rd Overall UCI Road World Cup
 4th Clásica de San Sebastián
 4th Züri–Metzgete
 4th Japan Cup
 5th Overall Tour de Langkawi
1st Stage 1 (ITT)
 8th Road race, UCI Road World Championships
 8th Paris–Brussels
 8th Giro dell'Emilia
 9th Milano–Torino
 10th Giro di Lombardia
1999
 1st Paris–Roubaix
 1st Giro del Piemonte
 3rd Millemetri del Corso di Mestre
 4th Firenze–Pistoia
2000
 1st Paris–Tours
 6th Gran Premio Bruno Beghelli
 10th Paris–Roubaix
2001
 1st Stage 1 Vuelta a Burgos
 2nd Firenze–Pistoia
 8th Giro della Provincia di Siracusa
2002
 1st Tour of Flanders
 8th Overall Tour Down Under
 10th GP Ouest–France
2003
 5th Paris–Roubaix

References

External links

1966 births
Living people
People from Fucecchio
Italian male cyclists
Sportspeople from the Metropolitan City of Florence
Cyclists from Tuscany